Lepyokhin (from лепёшка meaning flatbread) is a Russian masculine surname, its feminine counterpart is Lepyokhina. It may refer to
Ivan Lepyokhin (1740–1802), Russian naturalist, zoologist and botanist
Konstantin Lepyokhin (born 1975), Russian football coach and a former player

Russian-language surnames